George Junkin (1790–1868) was first president of Lafayette College, president of Miami University and Washington and Lee University.

George Junkin may also refer to: 

 George C. Junkin, member of the Nebraska House of Representatives
 George G. Junkin (1839–1895), teacher, lawyer, and judge in Pennsylvania

See also
 George McJunkin (1851–1922), African American cowboy, amateur archaeologist and historian in New Mexico
 George S. Junkins, mayor of Lawrence, Massachusetts